The Unified Victim Identification System (UVIS) is an Internet-enabled database system developed for the Office of Chief Medical Examiner of the City of New York (OCME) in the aftermath of the September 11 attacks on New York City and the crash of American Airlines Flight 587.  It is intended to handle critical fatality management functions made necessary by a major disaster. UVIS is a strong flexible role-based application and permissions can be controlled dynamically.

In the event of a mass casualty event, it will initially be used by New York City's 311 call center operators, the New York Police Department, and OCME to gather key information to facilitate compiling an accurate list of missing persons.  UVIS will also be used by the OCME to track decedents and collect postmortem findings to facilitate the identification process after a disaster.  UVIS also contains a Pandemic Flu module to prepare against such an eventuality.  UVIS is a strong flexible role-based application and permissions can be controlled dynamically.

UVIS was built for the OCME by Nihilent, a consulting & solution integration company, and is a leading design thinking company, (formerly known as ICRA Sapphire).

Developed with public funds, UVIS is available to municipalities, counties, states, and other governmental agencies without charge, under license from New York City. Currently UVIS is in use at the Office of Chief Medical Examiner of the City of New York (OCME) and the State of New Jersey (OCSME).

Ante-Mortem Section 

The Ante-Mortem Section relates to activities carried out before an individual is absolutely known to be deceased.  These include recording key information about the missing individual and managing interactions with the missing person's family members.

Call Center module

Mass casualty events generate numerous calls to government agencies: for example, the 2005 London subway bombing generated some 42,000 calls to the UK. Casualty Bureau call centers within the Bureau's first hour of operation.  The Call Center module can handle tens of thousands of calls from individuals reporting or enquiring about missing persons, and record basic information about both the missing person and the caller.

Missing Persons module

The Missing Persons module enables NYPD Missing Persons detectives to conduct detailed interviews of family members, friends, and acquaintances of missing persons, and can store extremely detailed data ranging from clothing to physical characteristics such as eye and hair color to tattoo or scar information.

Family Assistance Center module

The UVIS Family Assistance Center module manages Family Assistance Centers (FACs), which are established to provide services to, and capture information from, the family and friends of injured, missing, or deceased disaster victims.  Services generally provided at a FAC include: grief counseling; childcare; religious support; facilitation of family needs such as hotel, food, and transportation; ante-mortem data collection by the investigative authorities and the medical examiner or coroner; and notification of death to the next of kin. The UVIS Family Assistance Center module tracks all interactions and appointments with the family of missing persons, and can manage the personal items of victims received from family members for identification purposes.

Records module

The Records modules handles requests for records from family members, lawyers, and public administrators, providing “Chain of Custody” for all records.

Post-Mortem Section
The Post-Mortem Section deals with human remains recovered from mass casualty sites.

Field Operation module

The Field Operations module can help users to manage incidents, field investigation, and the collection of remains and evidence, as well as maintaining records and documentation about remains and evidence.  Because internet connectivity will often be unavailable at disaster sites, the Field Operations module has a Microsoft Windows-based client version that can capture data off-line and synchronize with the main database when connectivity is available.

Disaster Mortuary Management module

The Disaster Mortuary Management module provides mortuary management functionality.  It supports the accessioning of remains, both check-in and check-out; the examination of remains by Medical Examiner and Anthropology; the tracking and documentation of autopsies and individual remains; and the final disposition of remains to funeral homes.

Disaster Victim Identification module

This module has bidirectional (from ante- to post-mortem and back) one-to-many search capabilities based on multiple criteria.  It possesses considerable identification tracking capabilities including DNA, fingerprint, radiology, and dental (see UDIM below).  The module enables identification review and verification, including DNA re-sampling.  It also enables the consolidation of fragmented remains as they are uncovered.

The Disaster Victim Identification module can conduct notification tracking, including communication both with family members and media about a given decedent.  It is capable of issuing death certification either when remains are found or not.  It also maintains a log of all family communications, and can schedule and track family visits.

UVIS Dental Identification Module (UDIM) module

A Forensic Odontology add-on, UDIM possesses detailed charting, complex and advanced search, and the ability to look for anomalies.

Pandemic Influenza Module
Pandemic influenza remains a serious threat.  The U.S. Health and Human Services Department forecasts that if a lethal flu pandemic strikes, deaths could range from 209,000 to 1.9 million.

If an influenza pandemic occurs, the magnitude of the event would demand a response from the NYC OCME to assist any governmental health care facilities as well as to support facilities in the private sector. Health care facilities which would be affected by a flu pandemic include public and private hospitals, nursing homes, retirement facilities, prison health clinics, public health clinics, and mental health hospitals.  During a flu pandemic causing mass fatalities, the limited morgues and decedent storage space at most health care facilities will be quickly overwhelmed.  The proposed solution consists of temporary morgues, known as Body Collection Points (BCPs), at health care facilities.  These would be either refrigerated 18-wheel trailers or refrigerated CONEX containers.

The UVIS Pandemic Flu module enables health care facility morgue managers to administer BCPs, allowing them to:  
Create a report for a set of remains, entering such information as the decedent’s medical history, usual residence, and next of kin, as well as report notes and the reporting physician’s information.  Creating a report automatically assigns a specimen number to the remains.
Search for a decedent using the specimen number, last name, first name, and/or date of death.
Check remains into or out of a BCP, storing them until they are ready to be released to a funeral home or funeral director.  Remains can also be moved from one BCP location to another.
Browse through all BCPs at the health care facility to locate remains.
Create a request for a BCP storage unit.
The Pandemic Flu module also enables medical examiner personnel to handle health care facilities’ requests for BCPs, managing the location and distribution of storage units at health care facilities, police precincts, or any other designated location.  If necessary, they can place a request on behalf of a facility. 
 
As well, Pandemic Flu module enables medical examiner personnel to create reports for decedents and to search for decedents using the specimen number, last name, first name, and/or date of death.  They can also track and record the progress of a decedent’s case.  Currently, the system tracks remains that are awaiting investigation, awaiting disposition, and transportation.  UVIS tracks time elapsed in each state and color-codes each record, giving an immediate visual indication of the status of each case.

NYC OCME personnel can also search the New York State Electronic Death Record System (EDRS) for decedents.

As part of UVIS, the Pandemic Influenza module’s data is available for search within the system.

Administrative Section
The Administrative Section allows users to create incidents, to which missing persons are attached; conduct records management; and carry out other system administration tasks.

Technical Description
UVIS is a multi-tiered, browser- and Windows-based application, written in Microsoft-based technology, and running on a minimum configuration of Microsoft Windows Server 2003 and Microsoft SQL 2000 / 2005 as the database engine.

Recent Updates 
Currently UVIS code base has been upgraded to support daily operations of the Medical Examiner Offices along with the disaster operations as most of the Post-Mortem operations are the same.  Based on permissions, the users can toggle between the daily and disaster option. Having the same application for both helps decrease user training in the event of a mass fatality.
A strong chain of custody has been built within the UVIS for tracking purposes.
In terms of technology UVIS has been upgraded to run on Microsoft Windows Server 2016 (and higher) and SQL Server 2016 (and higher).

Notes

References 
 City of New York Office of Chief Medical Examiner Pandemic Influenza Surge Plan To Manage In-Hospital Deaths Planning Tool
 City of New York Office of Chief Medical Examiner
 U.S. Department of Health and Human Services Pandemic Influenza Plan
 Report of the 7 July Review Committee  (London Assembly)

Nihilent (Formerly known as ICRA Sapphire) www.nihilent.com has been playing a key role in UVIS implementation at various agencies.

Office of Chief Medical Examiner
Forensics organizations
Pandemics
Emergency management software
Disaster preparedness in the United States
Forensic software
Forensic databases